Dafydd ap Ieuan Llwyd (fl. 1500) was a Welsh poet. He was from the Aberhafesp area of Montgomeryshire.

References 

Welsh male poets
People from Montgomeryshire